The Copa América of Beach Soccer (named natively in Spanish as the Copa América de Fútbol Playa) is a biennial international beach soccer tournament contested between the senior men's national teams of the 10 members of CONMEBOL. It is beach soccer's version of the better known Copa América in its parent sport, association football.

The tournament is organized by the governing body for football in South America, CONMEBOL, who established the event in 2016 following their declaration of commitment a year prior, to develop beach soccer on the continent. Exhibition-style events also held under the Copa América title took place in 1994–99, 2003 and 2012–14, but this fully competitive incarnation of the Copa América is the first to be officially sanctioned and organized by CONMEBOL, who also organize the other official Copa América events in association football and futsal.

Since 2023, it has been the main beach soccer championship disputed exclusively by South American national teams. It was previously one of two main championships along with the longer running World Cup qualification tournament, established in 2006. However, CONMEBOL announced the abolishment of the latter in 2022, in favour of having the Copa América double-up as its qualifiers for the World Cup instead. At this time, the tournament was also switched from taking place in even years to odd years.

Brazil are the current champions.

Results

Performance

Successful nations

All-time top goalscorers
As of 2023

The following table shows the all-time top 15 goalscorers.

Sources: 2016, 2018; Match reports: 2022, 2023.

Overall standings
As of 2023

Key:
Appearances App / Won in Normal Time W = 3 Points / Won in Extra Time W+ = 2 Points / Won in Penalty shoot-out WP = 1 Point / Lost L = 0 Points / Points per game PPG

Appearances & performance timeline 
Key

 – Champions
 – Runners-up
 – Third place
 – Fourth place

5th–10th — Fifth to tenth place
 – Did not participate
 – Hosts
Apps — Total appearances

See also
Copa América de Futsal

References

External links
CONMEBOL, official website
Beach Soccer Worldwide, official website
Copa América, at Beach Soccer Russia (in Russian)

 
Beach soccer competitions
CONMEBOL competitions
Biennial sporting events
Recurring sporting events established in 2016
2016 establishments in South America